Stjepan Boltižar (1 August 1913 – 30 November 1989) was a Croatian gymnast. He competed in eight events at the 1948 Summer Olympics.

References

1913 births
1989 deaths
Croatian male artistic gymnasts
Olympic gymnasts of Yugoslavia
Gymnasts at the 1948 Summer Olympics
Sportspeople from Varaždin